Melanochromis melanopterus is a species of cichlid endemic to Lake Malawi where it is found over rocky substrates.  This species can reach a length of  SL.  It can also be found in the aquarium trade.

References

melanopterus
Taxa named by Ethelwynn Trewavas
Fish described in 1935
Taxonomy articles created by Polbot